Bespoke is a studio album by American electronic music producer Daedelus. It was released on Ninja Tune in 2011.

Critical reception
At Metacritic, which assigns a weighted average score out of 100 to reviews from mainstream critics, the album received an average score of 72% based on 12 reviews, indicating "generally favorable reviews".

Larry Fitzmaurice of Pitchfork gave the album a 6.8 out of 10, calling it Daedelus' "first truly decent-sounding album". He added: "The whole thing is an enjoyable mess, and when this record is really cooking, listening to it has the pleasurable effect of someone messing with a radio dial." Bram Gieben of The Skinny gave the album 4 stars out of 5, saying: "Musical ideas crash and break against each other in a seamless, organic way, always with a sense of playful wonder." Mike Diver of BBC called it "another fantastically enjoyable album from an artist whose modus operandi, above anything else, seems to be ensuring his audience is having the best possible time."

Track listing

Personnel
Credits adapted from liner notes.

 Daedelus – composition, arrangement, production
 Milosh – vocals (1)
 Young Dad – background vocals (1), vocals (4)
 Pete Curry – percussion (1, 3), drums (2, 7, 8, 9, 10), guitar (9, 10)
 Amir Yaghmai – guitar (2), violin (4), whistling (4)
 Inara George – vocals (3)
 Andres Renteria – percussion (3)
 Om'Mas Keith – keyboards (5), basslines (5)
 Busdriver – vocals (6)
 Baths – vocals (7)
 Kelela Mizanekristos – vocals (8)
 Bilal – vocals (10)
 Poirier – production (10)
 Stephen Kaye – mixing, mastering
 Lina Lund Mortensen – textile design, art direction
 Hrishikesh Hirway – photography

References

Further reading

External links
 

2011 albums
Daedelus (musician) albums
Ninja Tune albums